The Women's 200 metre individual medley competition of the swimming events at the 2015 World Aquatics Championships was held on 2 August with the heats and the semifinals and 3 August with the final.

Records
Prior to the competition, the existing world and championship records were as follows.

The following records were established during the competition:

Results

Heats
The heats were held on 2 August at 10:28.

Semifinals
The semifinals were held on 2 August at 17:53.

Semifinal 1

Semifinal 2

Final

The final was held on 3 August at 18:54.

References

Women's 200 metre individual medley
2015 in women's swimming